The Senate of the Republic of Colombia  is the upper house of the Congress of Colombia, with the lower house being the House of Representatives. The Senate has 108 members elected for concurrent (non-rotating) four-year terms.

Electoral system

According to the Colombian Constitution, 100 senators (senadores) are elected from a single national constituency. The remaining two are elected in a special national constituency for Indigenous communities.

Colombian citizens living outside the country are eligible to vote, although, unlike in the lower house, they have no special representatives in the Senate.

For elections to the Senate in the national constituency, political parties or other movements and groups run single lists, with a number of candidates not exceeding the total number of seats to be filled. The current electoral system, adopted in 2003 and modified in 2009 and 2015, requires party lists to pass a 3% threshold in order to obtain representation. For the 2006 and 2010 elections, the threshold was set at 2%, before being raised by the 2009 reform to 3%.

Parties may run a closed list, with the order of candidates pre-determined, or opt for preferential voting (open list), where the position of candidates on the list is reordered based on the individual preference votes of the voters. In senatorial elections, voters choosing a party running a closed list only vote for the party list; voters who choose a party running an open list may indicate their candidate of preference among the names displayed on the ballot, if the voter does not indicate a preference and only votes for the party, the vote is valid for purposes of the threshold but not for reordering the list based on preferential votes.

For the two seats reserved to Indigenous communities, the electoral quota system is used (total votes divided by the total seats), with the threshold in this case being 30% of the electoral quota.

Eligibility
To be a senator, a person must be a natural-born Colombian citizen over the age of 30 at the time of the election. Representatives of indigenous communities seeking election as a representative of indigenous communities in the Senate must have held a traditional authority role in their community or have been the leader of an indigenous organization.

There are general rules of ineligibility and incompatibility which apply to both houses of Congress, explained here. In addition, general rules on the replacement and non-replacement of members depending on different circumstances also apply to both houses of Congress.

Exclusive powers of the Senate

 Approve or reject the resignations of the President and the Vice President.
 Approve or reject all military promotions conferred by the government on commissioned officers.
 Grant leaves of absence for the President in cases other than sickness, and determine the qualification of the Vice President to serve as President. 
 Allow for the transit of foreign troops through Colombian territory.
 Authorize the Government to declare war on a foreign nation. 
 Elect the Constitutional Court justices. 
 Elect the Attorney General.

Judicial powers

The Congress' judicial powers are divided between the Chamber of Representatives and the Senate. The Senate is responsible for taking cognizance of the charges brought by the House of Representatives against the President (or whoever replaces him/her) and members of the Comisión de Aforados even if they may have ceased to exercise their functions. The Senate determines the validity of the charges concerning actions or omissions that occurred in the exercise of these duties.

The Senate may assign the preliminary investigation to a group of its members, but the judgement is pronounced in a public session with at least two-thirds of senators in attendance.

In the trials to be conducted before the Senate, the accused is automatically suspended from his/her office once the charges brought have been admitted. If the charge refers to offences committed in the exercise of his/her duties or unworthiness to serve for misconduct, the Senate may only discharge him/her from office and/or temporarily or permanently strip the accused of their political rights. The accused, however, is brought to trial before the Supreme Court of Justice, if the evidence demonstrates the individual to be responsible for an infraction deserving of other penalties. If the charge refers to common crimes, the Senate confines itself to declaring if there are grounds for further measures; in the affirmative, the accused is placed at the disposition of the Supreme Court.

Current members

Latest election

See also
List of presidents of the Senate of Colombia

Notes

References

External links
Senate of Colombia official website
Congreso Visible, independent oversight of Congress by the Universidad de los Andes

 
1991 establishments in Colombia
Government of Colombia
Colombia
Legislative branch of Colombia